The House at 301 Caspian Street is a historic home in Tampa, Florida. It is located at 301 Caspian Street. On August 3, 1989, it was added to the U.S. National Register of Historic Places. It was designed by Franklin O. Adams. The House has 5 bedrooms and 6 full baths and 3 half-baths. An addition to the house was completed in 2007, adding 1 master bedroom and 1 1/2 Baths to the house. The house was sold to the Harris family on May 18, 2000.

References

External links
 Hillsborough County listings at National Register of Historic Places

Gallery

Houses in Tampa, Florida
History of Tampa, Florida
Houses on the National Register of Historic Places in Hillsborough County, Florida
Mediterranean Revival architecture of Davis Islands, Tampa, Florida